360 Degrees of Power is the only album by female emcee, author, and activist Sister Souljah. It was released in 1992 on Epic/SME Records.

Guest appearances were made by Chuck D ("State of Accommodation: Why Aren't You Angry") and Ice Cube ("Killing Me Softly: Deadly Code of Silence"). 

The album's music videos were banned by MTV. The album reached #72 on the Top R&B/Hip Hop album chart and sold only 27,000 copies.

Production
The album was produced in part by the Bomb Squad's Eric "Vietnam" Sadler.

Critical reception
The Los Angeles Times called the album "a stark, disturbing primer on black power," writing that Sister Souljah "uses crude street language and scathing humor to convey her controversial ideas." The Deseret News wrote that "the record fails by being too dogmatic to be entertaining, too hateful to be inspiring, too shallow in its musical and lyrical reach to be catchy." Trouser Press wrote that "Souljah’s militant Afrocentricity contains such positive elements as self-reliance, self-defense, entrepreneurship, unity and education, but proceeds into paranoia ... syllogism ... and absurd sexism."

Track listing
"African Scaredy Katz in a One-Exit Maze" (4:36)
"360 Degrees of Power" (3:36)
"The Hate that Hate Produced" (3:03)
"State of Accommodation: Why Aren't You Angry" (featuring Chuck D) (2:42)
"Nigga's Gotta" (3:02)
"Wild Buck Beer" (featuring MC Just Want to Get Paid) (1:09)
"The Final Solution: Slavery's Back in Effect" (5:27)
"Killing Me Softly: Deadly Code of Silence" (featuring Ice Cube) (3:05)
"Umbilical Cord to the Future" (featuring Ras Baraka) (4:46)
"The Tom Selloutkin Show" (1:16)
"Brainteasers and Doubtbusters" (4:38)
"My God is a Powerful God" (4:20)
"Survival Handbook vs. Global Extinction" (4:26)

Charts

References

External links 
 
 

1992 debut albums
Epic Records albums
Political hip hop albums
Sister Souljah albums